Pontarachnidae is a family of mites belonging to the order Trombidiformes.

Genera:
 Litarachna Walter, 1925
 Paralitarachna Cook, 1958
 Pontarachna Philippi, 1840

References

Trombidiformes
Acari families